Ekalaka Airport (FAA LID: 97M) is a public use airport located in Ekalaka, Montana. In 2020, there were approximately 200 movements, with 88% being general aviation and 12% being air taxis.

References

Airports in Montana